SME Europe (Small and Medium Entrepreneurs Europe) is the official business association of the European People's Party with the aim of defending the interests of small and medium-sized enterprises at European level. The organisation was founded in May 2012 by the three Members of the European Parliament, Paul Rübig, Nadezhda Neynsky and Bendt Bendtsen.

SME Europe is an organisation established under Belgian law. It has no legal link to the former SME Union, but numerous of its former members are now active in the newly established SME Europe.

Politically, SME Europe urges for a reform of the legal framework in favour of small and medium size enterprises (SME) all across Europe. It pushes for a more efficient use of EU funds to strengthen SMEs. Together with cooperation partners is regularly organises events at European level in order to raise awareness of the needs of SMEs.

The European Commission supports the organisation through its two honorary members, the Commissioner for Regional Development Johannes Hahn und EU Industry Commissioner Antonio Tajani. Furthermore, in 2013, the former President of the European Commission, Jacques Santer, the former President of Eurochambres, Christoph Leitl, as well as the former Vice-President of the European Parliament, Ingo Friedrich became Honorary Members of SME Europe.

External links
Description, retrieved 29 March 2013
Blog of SME Europe on Facebook, retrieved 1 April 2013
Statutes of SME Europe in English language, retrieved on 29 March 2013
Statutes of SME Europe in French language, retrieved on 29 March 2013

References 

Business organizations based in Europe
Organizations related to small and medium-sized enterprises
2012 establishments in Europe